Julien Duvivier (8 October 1896, in Lille – 29 October 1967, in Paris) was a French film director. He rose to prominence in French cinema in the silent era, and directed some of the most notable films of the poetic realism in the 1930s, such as La belle équipe and Pépé le Moko. During World War II he worked in the United States. He returned to France with Panic (Panique) in 1946 and continued to work in Europe for the rest of his career. He had a big commercial success with The Little World of Don Camillo which had 12.8 million admissions in 1952. His last film was Diabolically Yours from 1967.

Filmography

References

Duvivier, Julien
Duvivier, Julien